This is an incomplete list of lakes of Manitoba, a province of Canada.

Larger lake statistics

The total area of a lake includes the area of islands. Lakes lying across provincial boundaries are listed in the province with the greater lake area.

List of lakes

A

Lake Agassiz
Alberts Lake
Antons Lake
Armit Lake
Assean Lake
Aswapiswanan Lake

B
Bennett Lake
Beresford Lake
Bernic Lake
Betula Lake
Big Island Lake
Big Whiteshell Lake
Birch Lake
Birds Hill Lake
Bolton Lake
Boon Lake
Booster Lake
Bowden Lake
Boundary Lake
Brereton Lake
Bryan Lake
Buckland Lake
Burge Lake
Burton Lake

C
Cabin Lake
Caddy Lake
Cedar Lake
Clear Lake (Riding Mountain National Park, Manitoba)
Clear Lake (Rural Municipality of Grahamdale, Manitoba)
Clearwater Lake
Cormorant Lake
Crescent Lake
Cross Lake
Crowduck Lake

D
Dauphin Lake
De Gueldres Lake
Delta Marsh
Dennis Lake
Ditch Lake
Dog Lake

E
Echo Lake
Eden Lake (Manitoba)
Egenolf Lake
Egg Lake
Elton Lake

F
Falcon Lake
Falcons Bow Lake
Fisher Lake
Fox Lake
Foxwarren Lake

G
Gauer Lake
Gods Lake
Good Lake

H
Holt Lake
Horseshoe Lake

I
Island Lake

J
Jessica Lake
Joey Lake

K
Kakat Lake
Kakwusis Lake
Kasmere Lake
Kawakwunwit Lake
Kingfisher Lake
Kinsmen Lake
Kipahigan Lake
Kiskitto Lake
Kiskittogisu Lake
Kisseynew Lake
Kississing Lake
Knee Lake

L
Lac Brochet
Lac du Bonnet
Lake Athapapuskow
Lake Cargill
Lake Devonian
Lake Manitoba
Lake of the Prairies
Lake of the Woods
Lake St. Martin
Lake Wahtopanah
Lake Winnipeg
Lake Winnipegosis
Leo Lake
Limestone Lake
Lindals Lake
Little Bolton Lake
Little Limestone Lake
Liz Lake
Lizard Lake
Lone Island Lake
Lonely Lake
Loon Lake
Lost Fry Lake
Lynx Lake

M
Mackie Lake
Manitoba memorial lakes
Marchand Lake
Mid Lake
McKay Lake
Minnedosa Lake
Mitatut Lake
Molson Lake
Montago Lake
Moose Lake
Mud Turtle Lake
Muir Lake
Munroe Lake
Murray Lake
Musketasonan Lake

N
Nao Lake
Naosap Lake
Naosap Mud Lake
Natalie Lake
Nejanalini Lake
Nelson Rapids
Neso Lake
Nesosap Lake
Netley Lake
Nikotwasik Lake
Nisto Lake
Nistosap Lake
Niyanun Lake
Norman Mitchell Lake
Norris Lake
Nueltin Lake

O
Oak Hammock Marsh
Oak Lake (Manitoba)
Olafson Lake
One Stone Lake
Ospawagon Lake
Oxford Lake

P
Paint Lake
Payuk Lake
Payukosap Lake
Pekwachnamaykoskwaskwaypinwanik Lake
Pelican Lake
Persian Lake
Playgreen Lake
Prime Lake
Putahow Lake

R
Red Deer Lake
Red Sucker Lake
Reindeer Lake
Rice Lake
Rock Lake
Rushforth Lake

S
Schist Lake
Shethanei Lake
Setting Lake
Shellmouth Reservoir
Shoal Lakes
Sipiwesk Lake
Snowshoe Lake
Southern Indian Lake
South Lake
Split Lake
Springer Lake
St. Malo Reservoir
Stephenfield Lake
Stephens Lake
Stony Lake
Stonys Lake
Stupid Lake
Swamp Lake
Swan Lake

T
Tamarack Lake
Tapukok Lake
Thompson Lake
Toews Lake
Touchwood Lake
Twin Lake

U
Unruh Lake
Uyenanao Lake

V
Vermilyea Lake

W
Wallace Lake
War Eagle Lake
Wargatie Lake
Wasp Lake
Waterhen Lake
Weir Lake
West Hawk Lake
West Lynn Lake
White Lake
Whitefish Lake
Whitemouth Lake
Woollard Lake

See also
List of rivers of Manitoba
Geography of Manitoba
Manitoba memorial lakes

References

Lakes
Manitoba